Warren L. Root was a member of the Wisconsin State Assembly.

Biography
Root was born on March 4, 1837, in Jefferson County, New York. He later moved to Outagamie County, Wisconsin.

Career
Root was elected to the Assembly in 1902. Previously, he had served as a town treasurer from 1864 to 1868. He was a Republican.

References

People from Jefferson County, New York
People from Outagamie County, Wisconsin
Republican Party members of the Wisconsin State Assembly
1837 births
Year of death missing